Matheus Henrique Frizzo (born 24 July 1998) is a Brazilian professional footballer who plays as a midfielder for Grêmio.

Professional career
A youth product of Corinthians, Frizzo was released in 2014 after tweeting admiration to his idol Kaká for signing with Corinthians' rival São Paulo. São Paulo ended up signing Frizzo to their youth academy in 2015.

On 2 February 2018, Frizzo signed with Grêmio. Frizzo made his professional debut with Grêmio in a 3-2 Campeonato Brasileiro Série A loss to Goiás on 8 December 2019.

Honours
Grêmio
Campeonato Gaúcho: 2018, 2019, 2022

Botafogo
Campeonato Brasileiro Série B: 2021

References

External links
 
 Grêmio Profile

1998 births
Living people
People from Guarulhos
Brazilian footballers
Association football midfielders
Campeonato Brasileiro Série A players
Campeonato Brasileiro Série B players
Grêmio Foot-Ball Porto Alegrense players
Atlético Clube Goianiense players
Esporte Clube Vitória players
Botafogo de Futebol e Regatas players
Footballers from São Paulo (state)